Bruno de Castro Iacovino (born 1 July 1997), commonly known as Bruninho, is a Brazilian futsal player who plays for Dinamo-Samara and the Brazilian national futsal team as a winger. Bruninho is the youngest son of futsal coach and former Brazilian international futsal player Vander Iacovino.

References

External links
Liga Nacional de Futsal profile

1997 births
Living people
Brazilian men's futsal players
21st-century Brazilian people